Mayol may refer to:

Buildings
 Stade Mayol, a multi-use stadium in Toulon, France

People
 Alberto Mayol (born 1976), Chilean sociologist, political analyst, and politician
 Félix Mayol (1872-1941), French singer and entertainer
 Guillem Bauzà (born 1984), full name Guillermo Bauzà Mayol, Spanish footballer
 Jacques Mayol (1927–2001), French free diver
 Jaime Augusto Mayol (born 1980), American model